Kifa or KIFA may refer to:കിഫ - KIFA
 Kiffa, city and department in Mauritania
 Killed in flight accident
 King Island Football Association, Tasmania, Australia
 Kiribati Islands Football Association